Series 25 of Top Gear, a British motoring magazine and factual television programme, was broadcast in the United Kingdom on BBC Two during 2018, consisting of six episodes between 25 February and 1 April. No changes were made to the line-up, which was considered an appropriate success to improving the programme, despite the series' viewing figures not averaging more than 3.15 million viewers. This series' highlights included a road trip across Japan in second-hand sports car, the presenters making their own home-made tractor, and a tribute to the Citroën 2CV.

Production
On 26 April 2017, the controller of BBC Two, Patrick Holland, announced confirmation that the programme would be returning for a new series in 2018, following "healthier" viewing figures than those made from the twenty-third series. Holland revealed in his announcement, that Matt LeBlanc, Chris Harris and Rory Reid would return for their second consecutive series as the three main presenters, with Sabine Schmitz and Eddie Jordan to continue making occasional appearances. Holland attributed the success of the show's previous series to it being led by LeBlanc and making it his own, alongside the assistance of Harris and Reid, but stated there was no comparisons between this show and that presented by Clarkson, Hammond and May, stating that viewers were "looking at two completely different shows" in that regard.

Filming for the series was confirmed on 22 June 2017, beginning with the presenters heading to Norway to record footage for an upcoming episode. LeBlanc was later spotted filming new scenes for the series in the Isle of Man in October 2017.

Episodes

References

External links
 Series 25 at the Internet Movie Database

2018 British television seasons
Top Gear seasons